Blackwater or Black Water may refer to:

Health and ecology
 Blackwater (coal), liquid waste from coal preparation
 Blackwater (waste), wastewater containing feces, urine, and flushwater from flush toilets
 Blackwater fever, an acute kidney disease
 Blackwater river, a classification of river with dark-colored waters

Places
 Blackwater, Queensland, a coal mining area in Australia
 Blackwater, Ontario, a community in the Township of Brock, Ontario, Canada
 Blackwater, County Wexford, a rural village in Ireland

United Kingdom
 Blackwater, Cornwall, a village
 Blackwater, Dorset, a small hamlet
 Blackwater, Hampshire, a small town
 Blackwater railway station
 Blackwater, Isle of Wight, a village
 Blackwater railway station (Isle of Wight), a former station
 Blackwater Reservoir, a reservoir in the Scottish Highlands

United States
 Blackwater, Arizona, a census-designated place in Pinal County
 Blackwater National Wildlife Refuge, a waterfowl sanctuary in Maryland
 Blackwater, Missouri, a city
 Blackwater, New Mexico, a power exchange between Texas and New Mexico
 Blackwater Dam, a flood control dam in New Hampshire
 Blackwater Draw, an archaeological site in New Mexico and a dry watercourse that extends across the Llano Estacado, Texas
 Blackwater Canyon, a gorge in West Virginia

Rivers
 Black Water (Conon), a river in the highlands of Scotland
 Blackwater River (Kerry), a river in County Kerry
 River Blackwater, County Cavan, a river in the north-west of County Cavan, Ireland
 Munster Blackwater, a river in the counties of Kerry, Cork, and Waterford, Ireland, also known as Blackwater
 Kells Blackwater, a river in the counties of Cavan and Meath, Ireland, also known as the Leinster Blackwater
 River Blackwater (Northern Ireland), a river which runs through County Armagh and County Tyrone, Northern Ireland, as well as County Monaghan, Ireland

Film and television
 Black Water (2007 film), an Australian horror/thriller film
 Black Water (2018 film), an action thriller starring Jean-Claude Van Damme and Dolph Lundgren
 "Blackwater" (Game of Thrones), an episode of Game of Thrones
 "Black Water", an episode of NCIS
 Blackwater (TV series), Scandinavian television drama (2023)

Books
 Blackwater, a 1983 serial horror novel by Michael McDowell
 Black Water (novella), a 1992 novella by Joyce Carol Oates
 Blackwater (novel) or Händelser vid vatten, a 1993 novel by Kerstin Ekman
 Blackwater: The Rise of the World's Most Powerful Mercenary Army, a 2007 book by Jeremy Scahill
 Black Water, a 2004 novel by D.J. MacHale in the Pendragon: Journal of an Adventure through Time and Space series
Black Water (memoir), a 2020 memoir by David A. Robertson

Arts
 Stratovarius or Black Water, a Finnish power metal band
 Black Water, a monodrama for soprano and piano by Jeremy Beck, based on the novella by Joyce Carol Oates

Albums
 Blackwater (Altan album), a 1996 Celtic music album
 Blackwater (Altan sampler), a sampler taken from the album 
 Black Water (Kris Drever album) (2006)
 Blackwater (MOFRO album) (2001)
 Black Water (Tinashe album) (2013)
 Black Water (Blu Mar Ten album), a 2007 album by Blu Mar Ten
 Black Water (Rudresh Mahanthappa album), a 2002 album by Rudresh Mahanthappa 
 Black Water, a 1989 album by Joe Zawinul

Songs
 "Black Water" (song), a song by the Doobie Brothers
 "Black Water", a song by Of Monsters and Men from Beneath the Skin
 "Blackwater", a song by Rain Tree Crow from Rain Tree Crow

Video gaming
 Blackwater (video game), a first-person shooter video game based on the company Blackwater Worldwide
 Blackwater, West Elizabeth, a fictional city in the Red Dead series
 Blackwater Industries, a fictional intergalactic company in Space Colony

Fiction
 Blackwater Bay, a fictional body of water alongside King's Landing in A Song of Ice and Fire

Companies
 Blackwater (company), a private American military company officially named Academi since 2011

Sports
 Blackwater 100, a former Grand National Cross Country off-road racing event
 Blackwater Bossing, a Filipino basketball team

See also
 Backwater (disambiguation)
 Blackwater Park, a 2001 album by Opeth
 Blackwater River (disambiguation)
 Czarna Woda, a town in Starogard County, Poland
 Cernavodă, a town in Constanţa County, Dobrogea, Romania
 Farnborough/Aldershot Built-up Area or Blackwater Valley Conurbation
 Kalapani (disambiguation)
 Karasu (disambiguation), ("black water" or "black river" in Turkic)
 Zwarte Water ("Black Water"), a river in The Netherlands